
 (The Black Book of Capitalism) is a 1998 French book published in reaction to The Black Book of Communism (1997). Unlike the earlier work, Le livre noir du capitalismes primary goal is not to try to attribute a number of victims to the political system in question. Rather, the body of the book comprises a series of independent works from various writers who each voice their critique on various aspects of capitalism. Topics covered range from the African slave trade to the effects of globalization.

An appendix provides an incomplete list of 20th-century death-tolls which editor Gilles Perrault attributes to the capitalist system. The list includes certain death-tolls covering the two World Wars, colonial wars, anti-communist campaigns, repressions and mass killings, ethnic conflicts, and victims of famines or malnutrition; bringing the incomplete total to 100 million deaths attributed to capitalism in the 20th century.

Contributors 
Contributors to the book include historians, sociologists, economists, trade unionists and writers such as:

 Caroline Andréani
 François Arzalier
 Roger Bordier
 Maurice Buttin
 François Chesnais
 Maurice Cury
 François Delpla
 François Derivery
 André Devriendt
 Pierre Durand
 Jean-Pierre Fléchard
 Yves Frémion
 Yves Grenet
 Jacques Jurquet 
 Jean Laïlle
 Maurice Moissonnier
 Robert Pac
 Philippe Paraire
 Paco Peña
 André Prenant
 Maurice Rajsfus
 Jean Suret-Canale
 Subhi Toma
 Monique and Roland Weyl
 Claude Willard 
 Jean Ziegler

Translations of the book have appeared in Greek, Portuguese,
Spanish,
Italian and Czech.

See also 
 Criticism of capitalism
 Schwarzbuch Kapitalismus
 The Black Book of Communism
 Le Livre noir du colonialisme

References

Bibliography

External links 
 Les Temps des Cerises
 Account of Capitalism
 Du Bon Usage des Livres noirs
 Summary of casualties
 François Delpla's chapter of book: La Seconde Guerre Mondiale

1998 non-fiction books
Books critical of capitalism
Political books
French books